The following is a list of centenarians – specifically, people who became famous as philosophers and theologians – known for reasons other than their longevity. For more lists, see Lists of centenarians.

References

Philosophers and theologians